Stone's Trace is a historic site located in Sparta Township, Noble County, Indiana.  The site includes four contributing buildings.  Stone's Tavern was built in 1839, and is a two-story, five bay, Federal style heavy timber frame dwelling.  It is sheathed in clapboard and has a side gable roof.  It was moved to its present site about 1860, and restored in 1964–1966. The Cyrus Kimmel house was built in 1875, and is a two-story, "L"-shaped, Italianate style brick dwelling.  Also on the property are the contributing granary and barn. The property is operated by the Stone's Trace Historical Society and Stone's Trace Regulators.

It was listed on the National Register of Historic Places in 1984.

References

External links
Stone's Trace Historical Society

History museums in Indiana
Houses on the National Register of Historic Places in Indiana
Federal architecture in Indiana
Italianate architecture in Indiana
Houses completed in 1839
Houses completed in 1875
Buildings and structures in Noble County, Indiana
National Register of Historic Places in Noble County, Indiana
Taverns in the United States
Museums in Noble County, Indiana
Drinking establishments in Indiana
1839 establishments in Indiana